The Belyando River, including the Belyando River (Western Branch), is a river system located in Central Queensland, Australia.

It is pronounced Bel-yando.

Course and features
The river flows generally in a northerly direction, joined by twenty-nine tributaries including the Carmichael River. The Belyando River flows through a series of waterholes and lagoons including Grays Lagoon, Bakoolama Waterhole, Ten Mile Waterhole, Boadles Waterhole, Georges Waterhole, Broadna Waterhole, Alinya Waterhole, Sandy Camp Waterhole, Bygana Waterhole, Dunjarrobina Waterhole and Yarmina Waterhole. The river reaches its confluence with the Suttor River before flowing into Lake Dalrymple and joining the Burdekin River.

Land use in the catchment is dominated by grazing with some cropping. Some of the catchment is included in the Narrien Range National Park and the Epping Forest National Park.

History
The traditional custodians of the land surrounding the Belyando River are the various indigenous Wakelbura people, including the various smaller Auanbura, Dorobura, and Metherabura clans.

Miyan (slso known as Mian) is a language of North/Central Queensland.The Miyan language region includes the landscape within the local government area of the Central Highlands Region, including the localities of Mount Douglas, Bulliwallah and Lake Galilee.

Yagalingu (also known as Jagalingu, Auanbura, Kokleburra, Owanburra, Kowanburra, Wagalbara, and Djagalingu) is an Australian Aboriginal language of Central Queensland. Its traditional language region was within the local government area of Isaac Region, from the headwaters of the Belyando River south to Avoca, north to Laglan, west to the Great Dividing Range, and east and south to Drummond Range.

The first European to discover the river was explorer Thomas Mitchell in 1846 on his fourth and last expedition.

The 2010–11 Queensland floods caused widespread flooding along the river and the extended isolation of properties from inundation which needed food supply drops.

See also

References

External links

Rivers of Queensland
Floods in Queensland
Central Queensland